Maurizio Zandron (born 15 November 1992) is an Italian-born figure skater who currently competes for Austria; he previously represented Italy until 2018. He is the winner of several medals in international competition, including gold at the 2016 Denkova-Staviski Cup, 2018 Bavarian Open, and 2018 Sofia Trophy. Additionally, Zandron is a three-time Austrian national champion (2019–21).

Personal life 

Maurizio Zandron was born on 15 November 1992 in Bolzano, Italy. He has an economics degree from Università Cattolica del Sacro Cuore in Milan. Owing to his maternal great-grandmother's roots, he obtained Austrian citizenship in July 2018. His brother, Marco, competes in pair skating for Spain.

Career

Early years 

Zandron began learning to skate in 2000. His early coaches included Melita Dona and Gabriele Minchio. His ISU Junior Grand Prix debut came in 2007. He made his first senior international appearance in early April 2010 at the Triglav Trophy. By the 2010–2011 season, he was training under Viktoria Andreeva in Bolzano and Merano.

2011–2012 to 2015–2016 
Cristina Mauri became Zandron's coach in the 2011–2012 season. He represented Italy at the 2012 World Junior Championships in Minsk, Belarus; he qualified to the final segment and finished 20th overall.

His first senior international medal, silver, came at the Denkova-Staviski Cup in December 2012. Italy initially selected him to compete at the 2013 European Championships but then decided to name Paolo Bacchini.

Zandron took bronze at the 2013 Crystal Skate of Romania, bronze at the 2015 Triglav Trophy, silver at the 2016 Cup of Tyrol, and silver at the 2016 Triglav Trophy.

2016–2017 season 

Zandron trained in Italy with Mauri and also spent time in Barrie, Ontario, Canada, where he was coached by Doug Leigh. He won his first senior international title at the Denkova-Staviski Cup in October 2016 and followed up with silver at the Merano Cup. Italy assigned him to compete at the 2017 European Championships in Ostrava, Czech Republic. Ranked 18th in the short program, he advanced to the free skate and would finish 19th overall.

2017–2018 season 

Zandron won silver at the Volvo Open Cup, silver at the Santa Claus Cup, gold at the Bavarian Open, and gold at the Sofia Trophy. He also won his fourth national bronze medal.

2018–2019 season 
Zandron received an invitation to his first Grand Prix event, the 2018 Rostelecom Cup, but had to decline due to his decision to change countries. In July 2018, an Italian newspaper reported that he would represent Austria and that, as a result, he was not allowed to compete until 12 February 2019. He planned to continue training in Milan with Cristina Mauri and to also train in Innsbruck under Claudia Houdek.

2019–2020 season 
Zandron was assigned to make his World Championship debut in Montreal, but the 2020 World Championships were cancelled as a result of the coronavirus pandemic.

2020–2021 season 
With the initial assignments for the new season limited by pandemic-related travel restrictions, Zandron attended the 2020 CS Nebelhorn Trophy with other skaters training in Europe.  He placed fourth. He went on to place fifth at the 2020 CS Budapest Trophy, and fourth at the Tallink Hotels Cup. Assigned to the 2021 World Championships in Stockholm, he placed twenty-ninth.

2021–2022 season 
Zandron began the season at the 2021 CS Lombardia Trophy, where he placed thirteenth. He placed fourteenth at the 2021 CS Nebelhorn Trophy, insufficient to earn a place for Austria at the 2022 Winter Olympics. He went on to place sixth at the Cup of Nice and fifth at the 2021 CS Cup of Austria.

After winning silver at the Austrian championships, he was seventeenth at the 2022 European Championships and seventeenth as well at the 2022 World Championships.

2022–2023 season 
Zandron won the Crystal Skate and placed ninth at the 2022 CS Ice Challenge before being invited to make his Grand Prix debut at the 2022 NHK Trophy. He finished eleventh of twelve skaters in Sapporo. Austrian champion again, he finished eleventh at the 2023 European Championships.

Programs

Results 
GP: Grand Prix; CS: Challenger Series; JGP: Junior Grand Prix

For Austria

For Italy

References

External links 

 
 Maurizio Zandron at Tracings

Italian male single skaters
1992 births
Living people
Sportspeople from Bolzano
Competitors at the 2015 Winter Universiade
Competitors at the 2013 Winter Universiade
Competitors at the 2017 Winter Universiade